Jeffrey P. "Jeff" Fontas (born January 14, 1987, Nashua, New Hampshire) is a Democratic former member of the New Hampshire House of Representatives, representing the 24th District from 2006 to 2008. He attended Northeastern University and later worked for Congressman Paul Hodes (D-NH).

References

External links
Project Vote Smart - Representative Jeffrey P. Fontas profile
2006 campaign contributions

1987 births
Living people
Politicians from Nashua, New Hampshire
Northwestern University alumni
Democratic Party members of the New Hampshire House of Representatives